There are many claims that the Central Intelligence Agency (CIA) has repeatedly intervened in the internal affairs of Iran, from the Mossadegh coup of 1953 to the present time. The CIA is said to have collaborated with the last Shah, Mohammad Reza Pahlavi. Its personnel may have been involved in the Iran-Contra affair of the 1980s. More recently in 2007-8 the CIA were claimed to be supporting the Sunni terrorist group Jundallah against Iran, but these claims were refuted by a later investigation.

Mossadegh coup

By 1950, 40% of the western and 75% of Europe's oil was produced in Iran. Britain, resentful of the nationalization of Iran's oil industry, drew up a plan in 1951 to occupy Iran's oil lands. Due to similar circumstances in Venezuela and Saudi Arabia, the Iranians began to desire 50% of the profits from the oil and also a bigger role regarding the company's management.  Prime Minister Mohammed Mossadegh wanted to rebuild the country but the wealth was leaving because of the British. Concerns arose that the actions taken by the British including imposing heavy economic sanctions and embargoes on Iranian oil, would cause Iran to begin aiding the Soviets. In spite of these hardships,  Mossadegh refused to abandon his stance.  So the British turned to the US for help, but the Truman administration was not interested and remained neutral in this conflict. After months of holding out against Britain's wishes, the British concluded that Mossadegh had to be replaced with someone who would be more inclined to British interests. When Eisenhower became president in January 1953, the U.S. allied with Britain in this conflict.
Mossadegh responded to this partnering by offering the U.S. the following ultimatum: Iran would sell oil to the U.S. with a 40% discounted rate or the Iranian oil companies would start selling their oil to the Soviets. The U.S. remained resolute with Britain stating that until an agreement and compensation had been met with Britain on their end, they could not discuss any matters concerning oil.
Plan Y, was an operation that would have consisted of a three part attack. These three parts would involve an assault on land, air, and sea. Britain attempted to seek aid from the United States under the Truman administration, but the U.S. declined, due to a possible conflict that could arise with the Soviet Union. In 1952, Britain constructed a plan for a Coup and pressed the U.S. to mount a joint operation to remove the democratically elected government of Prime Minister Mohammed Mossadegh and install the Shah Mohammed Reza Pahlavi to rule Iran autocratically. Representatives of British Intelligence met with CIA representatives in Washington in November and December 1952 for the purpose of discussing a joint war and stay-behind plans in Iran.  Although it was not on the previously agreed upon agenda of the meeting, British Intelligence representatives brought up the proposition of a joint political action to remove Prime Minister Mossadeq.  Mohammed Mossadeq was Iran's first elected prime minister appointed through popular demand by the people of Iran. Mossadeq felt that the wealth needed to rebuild Iran was leaving the country under the control of a British company called Anglo-Iranian oil company aka British Petroleum (BP). While in power, Mossadeq successfully put in place the naturalization of the oil industry in Iran which gave him control over the oil industry. As a result, the British company sued Mossadeq in the world court and loss. In order to regain control of the oil industry the British persuaded and collaborated with the US government to overthrow Mossadeq. In March 1953, The CIA began to draft a plan to overthrow Mossadeq. On April 16, 1953, a comprehensive study entitled: "Factors Involved in the Overthrow of Mossadeq" was completed.

The study indicated that a Shah/General Zahedi combination, supported by local CIA assets and financial backing, would have a good chance of overthrowing Mossadeq. Partially due to this report, and partially due to the fear of Communist overthrow and spreading in the region due to increasing influence of the Communist Tudeh party. The US also decided to get involved to gain control of a larger share of Iranian oil supplies. The US agreed to the operation dreamed up by the British  Brigadier General Norman Schwarzkopf, Sr. and CIA guru Kermit Roosevelt, Jr. were ordered to begin a covert operation to overthrow Mossadeq. The resulting operation was inspired by Plan Y and was renamed Operation Ajax. Operation Ajax was granted authorization by the Department of State and the British Foreign Office in mid-July 1953. Operation Ajax was conceived and executed from the US Embassy in Tehran where the 1979 Hostage Crisis would take place. Operation Ajax had four main parts: First, a massive propaganda campaign to ruin Mossadeq's name and accuse him of communist affiliations (though he was famously democratic). Second, encourage disturbances within Iran. Third, pressure the Shah into selecting a new prime minister to replace Mossadeq. Fourth, support Zahedi as a replacement for Mossadeq.

Operation Ajax was implemented the following year, though was initially unsuccessful. One of the most influential figures in this coup was Kermit Roosevelt, the grandson of former President Theodore Roosevelt, and head of CIA operations in the Middle East. with the cooperation of the Department of State, the CIA had articles planted in the United States but when reproduced in Iran, it had psychological affects in Iran and contributed to the war.

A notable, effective cause for public unease with Mossadeq's leadership was the letter that President Eisenhower sent him in response to his call to the U.S. for economic aid, due to not agreeing to the British oil deal.  Eisenhower writes "The failure of Iran and of the United Kingdom to reach an agreement with regard to compensation has handicapped the Government of the United States in its efforts to help Iran."  According to CIA reports, this succeeded in weaking Mossadeq's position, and turned the media, the Parliament, and the populace against him. The CIA also increased their propaganda campaign to link Mossadeq to the Communists. In an attempt for a second coup, the CIA began to bribe the army and police officials.  In order for Zahedi to receive the financial assistance he badly needed, the CIA made 5 million dollars available within two days of Zahedi's assumption of power. After several attempts and over 7 million dollars were spent, operations to overthrow Mossadeq were completed. Zahedi immediately implemented martial law and began executing nationalist leaders. Mossadeq was spared from execution by serving 3 years in solitary confinement and after he remained on house arrest until his death. The Coup in Iran was the CIA's first successful coup operation. Mossadeq was removed from power and Iran oil shares were split amongst the British, French, and United States for a 25-year agreement in which Iran would earn 50% of the oil profits. Britain earned 40% of the oil shares, the Dutch Oil Company, Shell received 14%, French CFP received 6%, and the United States received the remaining 40%. By 1953, the U.S. installed a pro-U.S. dictator, Shah Mohammad Reza Pahlavi. Over the next decades the Shah increased the economic strength of Iran but he also repressed political dissent. He accomplished this through the use of a secret police force known as the SAVAK, which he had help in creating via the CIA and Mossad. The Shah was accused by many as trying to get rid of Islam, despite the fact that the country's population was over 90% Muslim. This eventually led to the rise of political Islam in Iran. In a speech on March 17, 2000, before the American Iranian Council on the relaxation of U.S. sanctions against Iran, Secretary of State Madeleine Albright said: "In 1953, the United States played a significant role in orchestrating the overthrow of Iran's popular prime minister, Mohammed Mossadegh. Further proof of the United States involvement was announced on March 19, 2013, the 60th anniversary of the overthrow, when the National Security Service posted recently declassified documents that the CIA had on the coup. Although previous to this the CIA claimed that all the documents about 1953 were destroyed or lost in the 1960s because of lack of storage space.

Reconnaissance of USSR
Through the Cold War in the 1960s and 1970s, the CIA used their alliance with the government of Iran to acquire an advantage over their Soviet counterparts with the Iranian airfields, airspace, and Air Force assets for aggressive, airborne reconnaissance missions along the edge of the Soviet territories and Warsaw Pact countries in Project Dark Gene.  The advantage gained over their Soviet counterparts were crucial to the almost daily sorties that were flown near the borders of the USSR and Warsaw Pact countries.  Below there is a map of the USSR highlighted in green.  You can see the Middle Eastern States that border the far southern Soviet States, which helps us to identify the motives for the U.S. and the American intelligence community's obsession over states such as Iran.  By allowing American military and spy forces to stage in northern Iran, it would ensure the less likely of suicide missions and more friendly airspace.  This helped to keep the numbers of pilots and personnel killed in action to a minimum.  During the 1970s, Iran maintained a good relationship with the United States, which allowed the U.S. to install long range radar technology and establish listening posts enabling the U.S. to monitor activities in the Soviet Union.

Information of the KGB USSR to the International Department of the CC CPSU,
October 10, 1979.
"The Leadership of Iran About the External Security of the Country"
"According to KGB information, in August in Teheran a secret meeting was held with the participation of representatives of the Prime Minister, the Ministries of Foreign and Internal Affairs, the Intelligence and Operational Administrations of the General Staff, Gendarme and Police Administrations of the General Staff and the Staff of the "Corps of Defenders of the Revolution," with the goal of studying issues which touch on the security of Iran. It was noted that the USSR and the US, which have their own interests this region, are worried about the victory of the Islamic revolution in Iran.~ presumed that the USA might resort to a direct military threat and realization of a blockade. But in the event that Iran will not take sharp steps which hurt the US, and will obstruct the penetration of the Soviets, this will ease the position of the USA. Evaluating the policy of the USSR in relation to the Iranian regime, the participants in the meeting came to the conclusion that insofar as strengthening the Islamic republic will
lead to a weakening of the position of the regime in Afghanistan, exert a certain influence on the Moslem republics in the USSR and will be "a brake in the path of penetration of Communism in the region," the Soviet Union "will not turn away from the ideological struggle and efforts to put into power in Iran a leftist government." It was stressed that with the aim of weakening the Islamic regime the USSR might organize "provocative"
activity among Iranian Kurds, Azeris, Turkmen, Baluchis, support leftist forces, create economic difficulties, resort to a military threat on the basis of the agreement of 1921. It was noted that Afghanistan is not in any condition to undertake military actions against
Iran. However, border conflicts are not excluded. In addition, Afghanistan is in need of economic assistance from Iran, which might soften its position. The positions of Iraq, Turkey, Pakistan, and Saudi Arabia were also analyzed." Based on research notes taken at the Center for the Preservation of Contemporary Documentation (Moscow), Fond 5, Opis 76, File 1355, Pages 17-20.

Identification of leftists
In 1983, the CIA passed an extensive list of Iranian communists and other leftists secretly working in the Iranian government to Khomeini's administration. A Tower Commission report later observed that the list was utilized to take "measures, including mass executions, that virtually eliminated the pro-Soviet infrastructure in Iran."

Iran-Contra affair
Beginning in August 1984, a small group within the US government, in the Iran-Contra affair, arranged for the indirect transfer of arms to Iran, to get of circumventing the Boland Amendments. This amendments were intended to prevent the expenditure of US funds to support the Nicaraguan Contras. Since the arms-for-hostages deal struck by the  Reagan Administration channeled money to the Contras, the legal interpretation of the time was that the CIA, as an organization, could not participate in Iran-Contra.

The relationships, first to avoid the Boland Amendment restriction, but also for operational security, did not directly give or sell U.S. weapons to Iran. Instead, the Reagan Administration authorized Israel to sell munitions to Iran, using contracted Iranian arms broker Manucher Ghorbanifar.   The proceeds from the sales, less the 41% markup charged by Ghorbanifar and originally at a price not acceptable to Iran, went directly to the Contras. Those proceeds were not interpreted as U.S. funds. The Administration resupplied Israel, which was not illegal, with munitions that replaced those transferred to Iran.

While Director of Central Intelligence (DCI) William Casey was deeply involved in Iran-Contra, Casey, a World War II Office of Strategic Services (OSS) clandestine operations officer, ran the Iran operation with people outside the CIA, such as White House/National Security Council employees such as John Poindexter and Oliver North, as well as retired special operations personnel such as John K. Singlaub and Richard Secord.

The scandal was ultimately compounded by a failure of the US to hide its delivery of weapons to the Iranians. The principal objective of North's clandestine mission was to deliver eight hundred antiquated missiles on an EL Al 747 to Lisbon, where they would then be transferred to a Nicaraguan plane secured by General Richard Secord. Secord's role in the mission was to then take the missiles to Tehran. CIA officials, most notably Duane Clarridge, worked around the clock in securing a better way of delivery. In late November 1985, a CIA 707 was secured from Frankfurt in order to deliver eighteen HAWK missiles to the Iranians on Monday, November 25. The plan required proof of presidential backing, which, due to the timing of the events, required a retroactive signature authorizing, "the provision of assistance by the Central Intelligence Agency to private parties in their attempt to obtain the release of Americans held hostage in the Middle East." The document was signed by Reagan on December 5, 1985.

The United States was convicted of violating international law by the International Court of Justice in the 1986 case of Nicaragua v. United States, but refused to participate or pay the reparations that had been ordered by the court.

Intelligence analysis
The Islamic Republic of Iran, or more commonly known by its shorthand name Iran, was described as a problem area in the February 2005 report by Porter Goss, then CIA Director, to the Senate Intelligence Committee. "In early February, the spokesman of Iran's Supreme Council for National Security publicly announced that Iran would never scrap its nuclear program. This came in the midst of negotiations with EU-3 members (Britain, Germany and France) seeking objective guarantees from Tehran that it will not use nuclear technology for nuclear weapons. This unsurprising given the political instability that has gripped the nation since the US and British intervention in 1953, and the shaky economic conditions that have gripped the nation for decades. Iran's economy is almost completely dependent on foreign oil exports, and its government is racked with blatant and open corruption.

"Previous comments by Iranian officials, including Iran's Supreme Leader and its Foreign Minister, indicated that Iran would not give up its ability to enrich uranium. Certainly they can use it to produce fuel for power reactors. We are more concerned about the dual-use nature of the technology that could also be used to achieve a nuclear weapon.

"In parallel, Iran continues its pursuit of long-range ballistic missiles, such as an improved version of its 1,300 km range Shahab-3 medium-range ballistic missile (MRBM), to add to the hundreds of short-range SCUD missiles it already has.

"Even since 9/11, Tehran continues to support terrorist groups in the region, such as Hizballah, and could encourage increased attacks in Israel and the Palestinian Territories to derail progress toward peace. Iran reportedly is supporting some anti-Coalition activities in Iraq and seeking to influence the future character of the Iraqi state. Iran continues to retain in secret important members of Al-Qai'ida-the Management Council—causing further uncertainty about Iran's commitment to bring them to justice.

"Conservatives are likely to consolidate their power in Iran's June 2005 presidential elections, further marginalizing the reform movement last year."

Alleged support for terrorist groups
During 2007–2008, there were allegations that the CIA was supporting the Sunni terrorist group Jundallah, but these claims were debunked by a subsequent investigation showing that the CIA "had barred even the most incidental contact with Jundallah." The rumors originated in an Israeli Mossad "false flag" operation; Mossad agents posing as CIA officers met with and recruited members of Jundullah in cities such as London to carry out attacks against Iran. President George W. Bush "went absolutely ballistic" when he learned of Israel's actions, but the situation was not resolved until President Barack Obama's administration "drastically scaled back joint U.S.-Israel intelligence programs targeting Iran" and ultimately designated Jundallah a terrorist organization in November 2010. Although the CIA cut all ties with Jundallah after the 2007 Zahedan bombings, the Federal Bureau of Investigation (FBI) and United States Department of Defense continued to gather intelligence on Jundallah through assets cultivated by "FBI counterterrorism task force officer" Thomas McHale; the CIA co-authorized a 2008 trip McHale made to meet his informants in Afghanistan. According to The New York Times: "Current and former officials say the American government never directed or approved any Jundallah operations. And they say there was never a case when the United States was told the timing and target of a terrorist attack yet took no action to prevent it."

Operation Merlin
Operation Merlin was a United States covert operation under the Clinton Administration to provide Iran with a flawed design for a component of a nuclear weapon ostensibly in order to delay the alleged Iranian nuclear weapons program, or to frame Iran.

In his book State of War, author and intelligence correspondent for The New York Times James Risen relates that the CIA chose a defected Russian nuclear scientist to provide deliberately flawed nuclear warhead blueprints to Iranian officials in February 2000. Risen wrote in his book that President Clinton had approved the operation and that the Bush administration later endorsed the plan. Earlier publication of details on Operation Merlin by the New York Times in 2003 was prevented by the intervention of National Security Advisor Condoleezza Rice with the NYT's Executive Editor Howell Raines.

Operation Merlin backfired when the CIA's Russian contact/messenger noticed flaws in the schematics and told the Iranian nuclear scientists. Instead of crippling Iran's nuclear program, the book alleges, Operation Merlin may have accelerated it by providing useful information: once the flaws were identified, the plans could be compared with other sources, such as those presumed to have been provided to the Iranians by A. Q. Khan.

Sabotage of Iran's nuclear program

Operation Olympic Games
Operation Olympic Games was a covert and still unacknowledged campaign of sabotage by means of cyber disruption, directed at Iranian nuclear facilities by the United States and likely Israel.  As reported, it is one of the first known uses of offensive cyber weapons.  Started under the administration of George W. Bush in 2006, Olympic Games was accelerated under President Obama, who heeded Bush's advice to continue cyber attacks on Iranian nuclear facility at Natanz. Bush believed that the strategy was the only way to prevent an Israeli conventional strike on Iranian nuclear facilities.

During Bush's second term, General James Cartwright along with other intelligence officials presented Bush with a sophisticated code that would act as an offensive cyber weapon. "The goal was to gain access to the Natanz plant's industrial computer controls ... the computer code would invade the specialized computers that command the centrifuges." Collaboration happened with Israel's SIGINT intelligence service, Unit 8200. Israel's involvement was important to the Americans because the former had "deep intelligence about operations at Natanz that would be vital to making the cyber attack a success." Additionally, American officials wanted to "dissuade the Israelis from carrying out their own preemptive strike against Iranian nuclear facilities." To prevent a conventional strike, Israel had to be deeply involved in Operation Olympic Games. The computer virus created by the two countries became known as "the bug," and Stuxnet by the IT community once it became public. The malicious software temporarily halted approximately 1,000 of the 5,000 centrifuges from spinning at Natanz.

A programming error in "the bug" caused it to spread to computers outside of Natanz. When an engineer "left Natanz and connected [his] computer to the Internet, the American- and Israeli-made bug failed to recognize that its environment had changed." The code replicated on the Internet and was subsequently exposed for public dissemination. IT security firms Symantec and Kaspersky Lab have since examined Stuxnet. It is unclear whether the Americans or Israelis introduced the programming error.

According to the Atlantic Monthly, Operation Olympic Games is "probably the most significant covert manipulation of the electromagnetic spectrum since World War II. The New Yorker claims Operation Olympic Games is "the first formal offensive act of pure cyber sabotage by the United States against another country, if you do not count electronic penetrations that have preceded conventional military attacks, such as that of Iraq's military computers before the invasion of 2003."

The Washington Post reported that Flame malware was also part of Olympic Games.

Leak investigation
In June 2013, it was reported that Cartwright was the target of a year-long investigation by the US Department of Justice into the leak of classified information about the operation to the US media. In March 2015, it was reported that the investigation had stalled amid concerns that necessary evidence for prosecution was too sensitive to reveal in court.

Stuxnet

Stuxnet is a malicious computer worm believed to be a jointly built American-Israeli cyber weapon. Although neither state has confirmed this openly, anonymous US officials speaking to The Washington Post claimed the worm was developed during the Obama administration to sabotage Iran’s nuclear program with what would seem like a long series of unfortunate accidents.

Stuxnet is typically introduced to the target environment via an infected USB flash drive. The worm then propagates across the network, scanning for Siemens Step7 software on computers controlling a PLC. In the absence of either criterion, Stuxnet becomes dormant inside the computer. If both the conditions are fulfilled, Stuxnet introduces the infected rootkit onto the PLC and Step7 software, modifying the codes and giving unexpected commands to the PLC while returning a loop of normal operations system values feedback to the users.

The worm initially spreads indiscriminately, but includes a highly specialized malware payload that is designed to target only Siemens supervisory control and data acquisition (SCADA) systems that are configured to control and monitor specific industrial processes. Stuxnet infects PLCs by subverting the Step-7 software application that is used to reprogram these devices.

Different variants of Stuxnet targeted five Iranian organizations, with the probable target widely suspected to be uranium enrichment infrastructure in Iran; Symantec noted in August 2010 that 60% of the infected computers worldwide were in Iran. Siemens stated that the worm has not caused any damage to its customers, but the Iran nuclear program, which uses embargoed Siemens equipment procured secretly, has been damaged by Stuxnet. Kaspersky Lab concluded that the sophisticated attack could only have been conducted "with nation-state support". This was further supported by the F-Secure's chief researcher Mikko Hyppönen who commented in a Stuxnet FAQ, "That's what it would look like, yes".

On 1 June 2012, an article in The New York Times said that Stuxnet is part of a US and Israeli intelligence operation called "Operation Olympic Games", started under President George W. Bush and expanded under President Barack Obama.

On 24 July 2012, an article by Chris Matyszczyk from CNET reported how the Atomic Energy Organization of Iran e-mailed F-Secure's chief research officer Mikko Hyppönen to report a new instance of malware.

On 25 December 2012, an Iranian semi-official news agency announced there was a cyberattack by Stuxnet, this time on the industries in the southern area of the country. The virus targeted a power plant and some other industries in Hormozgan province in recent months.

A study of the spread of Stuxnet by Symantec showed that the main affected countries in the early days of the infection were Iran, Indonesia and India:

Iran was reported to have "beefed up" its cyberwar capabilities following the Stuxnet attack, and has been suspected of retaliatory attacks against US banks.

In a March 2012 interview with CBS News' "60 Minutes", retired USAF General Michael Hayden – who served as director of both the Central Intelligence Agency and National Security Agency – while denying knowledge of who created Stuxnet said that he believed it had been "a good idea" but that it carried a downside in that it had legitimized the use of sophisticated cyberweapons designed to cause physical damage. Hayden said, "There are those out there who can take a look at this... and maybe even attempt to turn it to their own purposes". In the same report, Sean McGurk, a former cybersecurity official at the Department of Homeland Security noted that the Stuxnet source code could now be downloaded online and modified to be directed at new target systems. Speaking of the Stuxnet creators, he said, "They opened the box. They demonstrated the capability... It's not something that can be put back." A Wired magazine article about US General Keith B. Alexander stated: "And he and his cyberwarriors have already launched their first attack. The cyberweapon that came to be known as Stuxnet was created and built by the NSA in partnership with the CIA and Israeli intelligence in the mid-2000s."

Duqu 

On 1 September 2011, a new worm was found, thought to be related to Stuxnet. The Laboratory of Cryptography and System Security (CrySyS) of the Budapest University of Technology and Economics analyzed the malware, naming the threat "Duqu". Symantec, based on this report, continued the analysis of the threat, calling it "nearly identical to Stuxnet, but with a completely different purpose", and published a detailed technical paper. The main component used in Duqu is designed to capture information such as keystrokes and system information. The exfiltrated data may be used to enable a future Stuxnet-like attack. On 28 December 2011, Kaspersky Lab's director of global research and analysis spoke to Reuters about recent research results showing that the platform Stuxnet and Duqu both originated from in 2007, and is being referred to as Tilded due to the ~d at the beginning of the file names. Also uncovered in this research was the possibility for three more variants based on the Tilded platform.

Flame 

In May 2012, the new malware "Flame" was found, thought to be related to Stuxnet. Researchers named the program "Flame" after the name of one of its modules. After analysing the code of Flame, Kaspersky Lab said that there is a strong relationship between Flame and Stuxnet. An early version of Stuxnet contained code to propagate infections via USB drives that is nearly identical to a Flame module that exploits the same vulnerability.

Stars

The Stars virus is a computer virus which infects computers running Microsoft Windows. It was named and discovered by Iranian authorities in April 2011. Iran claimed it was used as a tool to commit espionage. Western researchers came to believe it is probably the same thing as the Duqu virus, part of the Stuxnet attack on Iran.

Abandoned spies
In September 2022, Reuters reported that the United States had employed websites disguised as fan pages focused on subjects such as Iranian soccer (Iraniangoals.com) or Johnny Carson to communicate with spies. These sites used fake search bars, which upon the entry of a password, would convert to a page upon which the spy could communicate with the CIA. These sites were poorly built, and their secretive functions were not well-disguised. Reuters reported that this led to the imprisonment of spies such as Gholamreza Hosseini, an engineer. Hosseini was jailed for almost a decade, and did not hear from the CIA after release.

References

CIA activities by country
Iran–United States relations
Iranian Revolution
Ministry of Intelligence (Iran)
Politics of Iran
SAVAK